The FIA Motorsport Games Rally Cup  is the first FIA Motorsport Games Rally Cup, to be held across tarmac stages around the Circuit Paul Ricard region, between Marseille and Toulon, France on 26 October to 30 October 2022. The category is open to cars entered by teams and complying with Group Rally2, Group Rally4 and Historic regulations. The events are part of the 2022 FIA Motorsport Games.

Entries

The following countries and crews are officially entered into the 2022 FIA Motorsport Games Rally Cup:

Itinerary
All dates and times are CEST (UTC+2).

Stage SS14, also called "Medals Stage", will be run at Circuit Paul Ricard on Saturday evening and will feature a Rallycross-style course in which the Top 3 of Rally2, Rally4 and Rally Historic will compete for Gold, Silver and Bronze.

Results

Stages 1-13
      Qualifies for the Medals Stage

Rally2

Rally4

RallyH

Medals Stage

Rally2

Rally4

RallyH

References

External links

Rally Cup
2022 in rallying